Creamed honey is honey that has been processed to control crystallization. Also known as honey fondant,  it has a smooth, spreadable consistency and lighter color than liquid honey of the same floral type. A method for producing creamed honey was first patented in 1935, and other methods have since been devised.

Description 
Creamed honey contains a large number of small crystals, which prevent the formation of larger crystals that can occur in unprocessed honey. The processing also produces a honey with a smooth spreadable consistency. Because it is the glucose that crystallizes in the honey, and because glucose crystals are naturally pure white, creamed honey is always lighter-colored than liquid honey of the same floral type.

Production methods 
The first method for producing creamed honey was patented by Elton J. Dyce in 1935.

A second method allows creamed honey to be made without adding heat. It differs from the Dyce method in that pasteurization is not used at any point in the process. Instead, microscopic seed crystals are added to fresh raw, liquid honey at a ratio of 1:10 or larger. This yields a batch of creamed honey in approximately 80 hours.

References 

Honey dishes